The Kingdom is the eighth studio album by English rock band Bush. It was originally scheduled to be released in May 2020 but it was later pushed back to a release date of 17 July 2020. The band released two singles prior to the album, the first being "Bullet Holes" which was released in May 2019 and featured in the film John Wick: Chapter 3 – Parabellum, and the second single off the album was "Flowers on a Grave" and was released one year later in March 2020.

Background and title of album
In May 2019, Bush set The Mind Plays Tricks on You as the title of their new studio album, tentatively due in fall 2019.

Recorded in Los Angeles, The Kingdom was the first Bush album on which Robin Goodridge did not perform, who had played as the drummer for the band since 1993.

Content 
Gavin Rossdale remarked in May 2018 that the next Bush album would contain "heavier" songs written from an "angrier perspective".

The Upcoming opined that Bush brought "electronic-laced alternative rock" to the new record, comparable to their previous effort Black and White Rainbows. To contrast, Kerrang! detailed that The Kingdom presented "a far heavier, more riff-based and muscular approach" that its 2017 predecessor. Rolling Stone Magazine opined The Kingdom to be a grunge effort, akin to the band's earliest work.

The Kingdom detailed many personal narratives in its lyrics. "Send in the Clowns" chronicled feelings of being misunderstood, "Crossroads" recounted taking decisions in life, while "Falling Away" narrated a feeling of personal freedom. Rossdale remarked in an interview with LouderSound that "Our Time Will Come" relayed "looking through anything bleak in your life and realising that amazing things are happening and amazing things will come".

Reception 

The Kingdom received an aggregate score of 57/100 from Metacritic suggesting "mixed or average reviews".

Neil Z. Yeung of AllMusic was heavily lauding of The Kingdom, declaring it "an absolute bounty of riffs" and to "recall the best" of past releases such as Golden State and The Science of Things.

Macie Bennett of American Songwriter gave a positive 4-out-of-5 star review, and opined that Bush "may have released its best yet" with The Kingdom.

British publication Entertainment Focus gave a highly praising review, and remarked that the record saw Bush "creating some of the most interesting, and diverse, music in the rock genre right now", and that it was an "addictive record" that should "see the band's popularity soar again".

A review by Paul Travers for Kerrang! was strongly positive, hailing The Kingdom "a return to Bush’s glory days".

Rolling Stone's Kory Grow gave mostly negative feedback, detailing that the songs "trudge through the same monochromatic grunge" of earlier releases. Grow further dismissed the record's music as derivative, commenting that the single "Bullet Holes" "musically, rips off U2’s “Bullet the Blue Sky”".

Track listing

Personnel
Gavin Rossdale – lead vocals, rhythm guitar
Chris Traynor – lead guitar, backing vocals
Corey Britz – bass guitar, backing vocals
Gil Sharone - drums (all tracks except “The Kingdom” & “Flowers on a Grave”)
Nik Hughes – drums

Charts

See also
List of 2020 albums

References

2020 albums
Bush (British band) albums
BMG Rights Management albums